The Russian Threat (1920) is one of the major works of Armenian politician Ruben Darbinyan in genre of political philosophy. The book was published in 1920 in First Republic of Armenia and republished in 1991 in newly independent Armenia by the Azat Khosk (Ազատ խոսք) publishing house.

History 
The book was written by the acting Minister of Justise of the First Republic of Armenia Ruben Darbinyan from 9 June to 8 July 1920 under the threat of return of Russia to Transcaucasia, when in April 1920 the Sovietization of Azerbaijan was carried out, followed by the May Uprising in Armenia. The text of the future book was published in Yerevan from 9 June to 8 July 1920 in the Araj Daily (Յառաջ) entitled as "On the Russian Front (Revaluation)". Subsequently, the articles from the newspaper were collected in a single collection, published in the form of the book.

Contents 
The book consists of 12 parts:
 I. Two fronts (I. Երկու ճակատ)
 II. Mongolian and Slavic elements (II. Մոնղոլական և սլավոնական տարերքը)
 III. Duality and illness of the Russian spirit (III. Ռուսական ոգու երկությունը և հիվանդությունը)
 IV. Nation-denying spirit and perversion (IV. Ազգամերժ ոգին և այլասերումը)
 V. Theocratic state and non-national mentality (V. Թեոկրատիկ պետությունը և ապազգային մտայնությունը)
 VI. Freedom of the person and nationality (VI. Անհատի ազատությունը և ազգությունը)
 VII. Language (VII. Լեզուն)
 VIII. Socialist psychosis and anti-national tendency (VIII. Սոցիալիստական պսիխոզը և հակազգային տենդենցը)
 IX. National distortion and development of political thought (IX. Ազգային այլասերումը և քաղաքական մտքի զարգացումը)
 X. Russophilia (X. Ռուսասիրությունը)
 XI. Russian imperialism and its manifestations (XI. Ռուսական կայսերապաշտությունը և նրա արտահայտումները)
 XII. Yesterday and Today (XII. Երեկ և այսօր)

See also 
 Anti-Russian sentiment
 Bolshevism and Armenia

References 

Foreign policy doctrines
Anti-Russian sentiment
Books about foreign relations of Armenia
Books about Russia
Armenia–Russia relations
Books about geopolitics
1920 non-fiction books
Books about imperialism
Armenian non-fiction literature